Ernie Hardeman (born December 4, 1947) is a Canadian politician who served as Ontario Minister of Agriculture, Food and Rural Affairs from 2018 to 2021 in the Doug Ford government  and as Minister of Agriculture and Food from 1999 to 2001 in the Mike Harris government. He represents the rural riding of Oxford for the Progressive Conservative Party.

Background
Hardeman was the owner and operator of Hardeman Feed Limited, established in Salford, Ontario from 1966 to 1995. Hardeman's nephew, John Vanthof, is a current sitting MPP for the New Democratic Party and behind his uncle in the legislature.

Politics
He served as Mayor of the Township of Southwest Oxford from 1988 to 1994. He was chair of the Wardens' Association of Ontario in 1990–91, and served as a board member on the Association of Municipalities of Ontario.

Hardeman was elected to the Ontario legislature in the provincial election of 1995, defeating incumbent New Democrat Kimble Sutherland by about 8000 votes. The Progressive Conservatives under Mike Harris won the election, and Hardeman was a government backbench supporter for the next four years. In 1996, he was commissioned by the government to conduct a survey on the possible amalgamation of Hamilton, Ontario into a united municipality.

He was easily re-elected in the 1999 provincial election. He was appointed to cabinet by Mike Harris as Minister of Agriculture, Food and Rural Affairs on June 17, 1999. As Minister, he replaced agricultural offices with the Agricultural Information Contact Centre. He was removed from cabinet on February 7, 2001. On February 25, 2003, he returned to cabinet under Ernie Eves in the new position of Associate Minister of Municipal Affairs and Housing, with Responsibility for Rural Affairs.

Hardeman was re-elected in the 2003 election.  He supported Jim Flaherty's unsuccessful bid for the Progressive Conservative party's leadership in 2004. On June 13, 2005 Hardeman's private members bill, Farm Implements Amendment Act, received third reading and royal assent.

In 2007 Hardeman was re-elected for a fourth consecutive term. He served as Deputy House Leader and was then promoted to Chair of the Standing Committee on Government Agencies. He is also the PC critic for Agriculture, Food and Rural Affairs.

On June 16, 2008 Hardeman introduced a private member's bill which allows farmers to post seasonal, directional signage along provincial highways to advertise their Ontario grown produce and direct consumers to the farm. The bill was supported by many agricultural groups and unanimously passed first, second and third reading. On December 10, 2008 Signage to Promote Ontario Produced Agricultural Products Act received royal assent and became law.

Electoral record

Cabinet positions

References

External links
 

1947 births
Living people
Mayors of places in Ontario
Members of the Executive Council of Ontario
People from Oxford County, Ontario
Progressive Conservative Party of Ontario MPPs
21st-century Canadian politicians